FAP 2026 is a general purpose off-road lorry made by Serbian vehicle manufacturer Fabrika automobila Priboj (FAP). The six-wheel drive lorry is designed for transport of personnel, weapons and material up to 6 tons of total weight, as for traction of weapons and trailer up to 7.2 tons of weight for the needs of the  Yugoslav People's Army.

Development
During 1965 the Department for Traffic of Federal Secretariat of People's Defense has formed work group with task to analyzes the unarmored vehicles of Yugoslav People's Army. The result of work group was the Study of non-combat vehicles and trailers in use with Yugoslav People's Army. The inferences of study were adopted by Main Military Technical Council in 1966. The study has concluded that there are 129 different vehicle marks in 320 types in service. A decision was made to reduce number of different vehicle marks in service by development of five vehicle classes: 0,75 tons 4x4 off-road vehicle, 1,5 tons 4x4 off-road truck, 3 tons 6x6 off-road truck, 6 tons 6x6 off-road truck and 9 tons 8x8 heavy off-road truck.

During the 1970s the plan for 1,5 tons 4x4 and 3 tons 6x6 off-road trucks was realized by TAM, while the 6x6 heavy truck was developed by the FAP. The first 6 tons 6x6 military truck model developed by FAP was FAP 2220, mainly produced for transportation of the sections of PM M71 pontoon bridge and prototype series of M-77 Oganj self-propelled multiple rocket launcher. The new model, designated FAP 2026 BS/AV was developed during the late 1970s and introduced to service in 1978. It was based on the Mercedes-Benz NG with a OM 402 8-cylinder, 4-stroke, water cooled diesel engine, due to the fact that FAP has produced trucks under Mercedes-Benz licence.

The FAP 2026 was mass-produced for the needs of the Yugoslav People's Army from 1978 until the 1990s. Several small series were produced during the 1990s after dissolution of Yugoslavia.

The FAP 2228 model was further development based on FAP 2026.

Variant
The standard variant is FAP 2026 BS/AV, with short cab and standard cargo bed. Used for transport of personnel (20 + 2 troops with equipment), materials and as tractor for artillery and anti-aircraft artillery weapons.

FAP 2026 BDS/AVG is used with PM M71 Floating Bridge as trucks for towing of tugboats, it has longer cab with cargo bed.
FAP 2026 BDS/A is variant with longer cab used as platform for different upgrades, as trucks for transportation of the PM M71 Floating Bridge sections, M-77 Oganj self-propelled multiple rocket launcher, mounting of M-85 Žirafa mobile radar and fire truck.

The standard FAP 2026 BS/AV was used also as platform for well drill (BMB) and SORA 122mm self-propelled howitzer.

Technical data

Engine
Engine type Mercedes-Benz OM 402
No. of cylinder 6 in-line
Bore/Stroke (mm) 102/130
Displacement (cm3) 6.370
Output power (kW/HP) 205/279
At speeds (rpm) 2.200
Max. torque (Nm) 1.100
At speeds (rpm) 1.200-1.600
Gearbox
Type 16MS-120, 16-speed, synchromesh
Rated inlet torque 1200 Nm
Transmission ratio: 13.68; 11.64; 9.4; 8.0; 6.73; 5.73; 4.79; 4.07; 3.36; 2.89; 2.31; 1.96; 1.65; 1.41; 1.18; 1.0
Reverse 11.06; 9.41
PTO PP 80 / 3C
PTO application for winch drive
Timing gear
Type - mechanic, differential with three axles and two gear ratios:
Gear ratio
On-road (direct) 1 : 1
Off-road (reduced) 1 : 1.6
Propeller shafts
Type - tubular, open, with universal joints (needle bearings in the joints) with protected telescopic connection, *without retaining bearings.
Drive axles
Type - Banjo, with fully unloaded axle shafts.
Front axle is steering.
Total transmission ratio 9.4

Cab

Type short tipping
Construction metal, tipping
Number of seats 2
Driver's seat single parts
Cab insulation made on the internal side with special insulation of the bonnet on the lower side
Ventilation wing window on doors and roof opening
Heating by hot air from engine, through heater and fan
Wipers electric

Winch 

Type with warm reducer and hydraulic power transfer
Rope total length 86 m, ø 16 mm
Towing force on the first drum winding 100.000 N +/- 10%

Wheels and tires 

No. of wheels 6+1 spare (2 in front, 4 at rear)
Type of wheel 2-part with flat rim
Rim size 11.25 - 21
Tyre type 15.00 - 21, special construction with pressure regulation dependent on terrain

Equipment

The vehicle is equipped with set of tools, accessories and spare parts.

Electric equipment

Rated voltage 24 V Two batteries, capacity 143 Ah
Generator alternator with full radio interference, waterproof, rated power 28 V, 85 A, positioned on the engine right side
Alternator regulator with full radio interference, 28V
Electric starter waterproof, 24V, of 4.8 kW.

References 

2026
Military trucks
Military vehicles introduced in the 1970s
Military equipment of Yugoslavia